The  is a 65.1 km railway line operated by the third-sector railway operating company Shinano Railway in Nagano Prefecture, Japan. It connects Karuizawa Station in Karuizawa with Shinonoi Station in Nagano.

Overview 
Before October 1997, the right-of-way now belonging to the Shinano Railway was a part of the Shinetsu Main Line of East Japan Railway Company (JR East), and served as the main train route connecting Nagano and Tokyo. Upon completion of the Nagano Shinkansen in October 1997, JR East transferred all long distance operations to the shinkansen, and control of the Shinetsu Main Line between Karuizawa and Shinonoi was handed over to the newly formed Shinano Railway, which is majority owned by the Nagano Prefectural Government. Today, the line is a vital commuter transport route for communities in the east and north of Nagano Prefecture.

The speed limit is 100 km/h (reduced from 120 km/h as the Shinetsu Main Line).

Like many railways in rural parts of Japan, the line faces problems concerning decreased ridership and revenue. Also, driver-only operation has been introduced on most of the line in order to reduce personnel costs.

Operations
Shinano Railway Line trains use the right-of-way of the Shinetsu Main Line between Shinonoi and Nagano. All trains terminate at Nagano, not Shinonoi.

As of April 2008, four round trains are operated as Rapids from Nagano. One in the morning from Komoro to Nagano, and two in the evening from Nagano to Ueda are named Shinano Sunrise and Shinano Sunset, require payment of surcharge between Nagano and Ueda.

Stations

Rolling stock 
 115 series 3-car EMU sets
 SR1 series (Debut on 4 July 2020)

Former Rolling stock
 169 series 3-car EMU sets (until April 2013)

Shinano Railway uses trainsets that were inherited from JR East when the line was transferred. The trains were subsequently repainted into Shinano Railway's livery and refurbished. Many of the trains have video screens above the doors which feature commercials and other information. In general, the 115 series trains are used for local services, while the 169 series were used for rapid and liner trains.

History
The line first opened on 15 August 1888 as the  gauge steam-operated  between Nagano and Ueda. This was extended south from Ueda to Karuizawa in December 1888. The line was electrified using a 1,500 V DC overhead wire system from June 1963.

The third-sector operator Shinano Railway was established on 1 May 1996, and operations of the Shinetsu Line between Karuizawa and Shinanoi were transferred from JR East to the Shinano Railway from 1 October 1997.

Driver only operation was introduced on some services from 5 January 2004.

Former connecting lines

(Note - Prior to 1997, the stations below were part of the Shinetsu Main Line.)
 Karuizawa Station: The Kusakaru Electric Railway opened a 56 km  gauge line, including two switch backs, to Kusatsu Onsen between 1915 and 1926. The line was electrified at 600 V DC in 1924. In 1950, a typhoon resulted in a bridge being swept away, and the same thing occurred in 1959, resulting in the 38 km section from Karuizawa to Joshu Mihara closing in 1960. The rest of the line closed in 1962.
 Komoro Station - The Nunobiki Electric Railway opened an 8 km line, electrified at 600 V DC, to Shimagawara in 1926 to transport construction materials for the Makato Azuma hydro-electric power station. When that traffic finished the revenue for the line was less than 50% of interest bill alone, and it closed in 1934.
 Oya Station: The Maruko Railway opened a 7 km line to Maruko  in 1918, and electrified the line at 600 V DC in 1924. The following year, it opened a 5 km electrified line from Oya to Ueda-Higashi. In 1944, the company merged with the Ueda Onsen Electric Railway (see next entry) creating the Maruko Ueda Electric Railway. Both lines closed in 1969.
 Ueda Station: The Ueda Onsen Electric Railway opened a 13 km line to Sanada, and a 3 km branch from Motohara to Sochi between 1927 and 1928, both lines electrified at 1,500 V DC. In 1944, the company merged with the Maruko Electric Railway (see previous entry) creating the Maruko Ueda Electric Railway. Both lines closed in 1972.
 Yashiro Station: The Kato Railway opened a 24 km line to Suzaka on the Nagano Electric Railway line in 1922, electrified it at 1,500 V DC in January 1926, and merged with that company in September the same year. CTC signalling was commissioned on the line in 1983, but due to falling patronage the line closed in 2012.

See also
List of railway companies in Japan
List of railway lines in Japan

References
This article incorporates material from the corresponding article in the Japanese Wikipedia.

External links 

  

 
Railway lines in Japan
Railway lines in Nagano Prefecture
1067 mm gauge railways in Japan
Japanese third-sector railway lines